Al-Tadamon  is a Saudi Arabian football (soccer) team in Rafha playing at the Saudi Fourth Division.

References

Tadamon
1976 establishments in Saudi Arabia
Association football clubs established in 1976
Football clubs in Rafha